Sandwell Borough F.C. was an English association football club.  Originally known as Smethwick Highfield F.C., and later as Ashtree Highfield F.C., the club competed in the Midland Football Combination between 1948 and 1988, the Southern League between 1988 and 1990, the Combination again between 1990 and 1994, and the Midland Football Alliance between 1994 and 2001, when the club folded. The club also regularly entered the FA Cup, but never made it beyond the qualifying rounds. The team played at the Oldbury Sports Centre in Newbury Lane.

Former players 
1. Players that have played/managed in the Football League or any foreign equivalent to this level (i.e. fully professional league).
2. Players with full international caps.
3. Players that hold a club record or have captained the club.
  Roland James

References

Defunct football clubs in England
Sport in Sandwell
Association football clubs disestablished in 2001
2001 disestablishments in England
Central Amateur League
Midland Football Combination
Southern Football League clubs
Midland Football Alliance
Defunct football clubs in the West Midlands (county)